Degaga "Mamo" Wolde (12 June 1932 – 26 May 2002) was an Ethiopian long distance runner who competed in track, cross-country, and road running events. He was the winner of the marathon at the 1968 Summer Olympics.

Early life
Degaga was born on 12 June 1932 in Ada'a to an Oromo family. His younger brother, Demissie Wolde (b. 8 March 1937), also became an international distance running star.

In 1951, Degaga moved to Addis Ababa.

Athletics career
At his first Olympic appearance in 1956, Degaga competed in the 800 m, 1,500 m and the 4x400 relay.

He did not compete in the 1960 Summer Olympics, when Abebe Bikila became the first Ethiopian to win a gold medal. Degaga claimed his absence was due to the government's desire to send him on a peacekeeping mission to the Congo during the Congo Crisis. According to him, in the government's ensuing conflict with the Ethiopian Olympic Committee, who wanted him to compete, he didn't get sent to either event. However, athlete Said Moussa Osman, who represented Ethiopia in the 800 m at the 1960 Olympics, stated that Degaga lost at the trials and didn't make it on the team.

Beginning in the 1960s, Degaga's focus changed from middle distance races to long distances. He made Ethiopia's first mark at international cross-country races when he took the International Juan Muguerza in Elgoibar, Spain, winning in 1963 and 1964, and at the Cross de San Donostin in San Sebastian, Spain, in the same years. He placed fourth in the 10,000 m at the 1964 Summer Olympics, which was won by Billy Mills of the United States in one of the biggest upsets in the history of Olympic competition. Demissie also became a marathon runner.

Both brothers competed in Tokyo, in the 1964 Olympic marathon. On 3 August 1964, in the Ethiopian Olympic trials, a race held at 8,000 feet, Degaga qualified by running 2:16:19.2, just 4/10ths of a second behind Abebe Bikela, with Demissie finishing 2:19:30, for 3rd place. Although Degaga dropped out early, Demessie, after being among the leaders for much of the 1964 Olympic race, finished tenth in 2:21:25.2. On 21 April 1965, as part of the opening ceremonies for the second season of the 1964/1965 New York World's Fair, Abebe and Degaga participated in an exclusive ceremonial half marathon. They ran from the Arsenal in Central Park at 64th Street & Fifth Avenue in Manhattan to the Singer Bowl at the fair. They carried with them a parchment scroll with greetings from Haile Selassie. In 1967, he repeated his wins in San Sebastian and Elgiobar, and won again at the latter event in 1968.

In the 1968 Summer Olympics, Degaga became the second Ethiopian to win gold in the marathon. Earlier in the same Olympics, he had won the silver medal in the 10,000 m. At the age of 40, Degaga won his third Olympic medal placing third in 2:15:08 at the 1972 Olympic marathon, while Demissie placed 18th in 2:20:44.0. Degaga also won the marathon race in the 1973 All-Africa Games. He blamed his Olympic third place showing in 1972 on ill-fitting shoes forced on him by Ethiopian officials. He became only the second person in Olympic history (Bikila was the first) to medal in successive Olympic marathons. Both medalists who finished ahead of Degaga, Frank Shorter from the U.S.A., and Belgium's Karel Lismont would repeat Degaga's feat in 1976 as they finished second and third behind East Germany's Waldemar Cierpinski. Cierpinski repeated his win in 1980. Erick Wainaina was the most recent and only other marathoner to accomplish the feat, finished third in Atlanta in 1996 and second in Sydney in 2000. Degaga also won the marathon race in the 1973 All-Africa Games.

Military career
In 1951, Degaga joined the Imperial Guard. He later served as a peacekeeper in Korea from 1953 to 1955.

Arrest
In 1993, Degaga was arrested on the accusation that he participated in a Red Terror execution during the regime of the dictator Mengistu Haile Mariam. He argued that although he was present at the killing, he was not a direct participant. The IOC campaigned the Ethiopian government for his release. In early 2002 he was convicted and sentenced to six years of imprisonment. Therefore, he was released because he had spent nine years in detention already waiting for his trial.

Death
On 26 May 2002, Degaga died of liver cancer at age 69, just a few months after his release. He had been married twice and had three children; a son, Samuel, with his first wife, and two children, Addis Alem and Tabor, with his second wife. Degaga is interred in Saint Joseph's Church Cemetery in Addis Ababa.

References

External links
 
 

1932 births
2002 deaths
Deaths from liver cancer
Deaths from cancer in Ethiopia
Ethiopian male long-distance runners
Ethiopian male marathon runners
Olympic athletes of Ethiopia
Athletes (track and field) at the 1956 Summer Olympics
Athletes (track and field) at the 1964 Summer Olympics
Athletes (track and field) at the 1968 Summer Olympics
Athletes (track and field) at the 1972 Summer Olympics
Olympic gold medalists for Ethiopia
Olympic silver medalists for Ethiopia
Olympic bronze medalists for Ethiopia
Medalists at the 1972 Summer Olympics
Medalists at the 1968 Summer Olympics
Olympic gold medalists in athletics (track and field)
Olympic silver medalists in athletics (track and field)
Olympic bronze medalists in athletics (track and field)
African Games gold medalists for Ethiopia
African Games medalists in athletics (track and field)
Athletes (track and field) at the 1965 All-Africa Games
20th-century Ethiopian people
21st-century Ethiopian people